Michael Jack Nobbs (born 4 January 1954) is a former international level field hockey player who has represented Australia as a member of the Australia men's national field hockey team  at the 1984 Summer Olympics. He also coached the India men's national field hockey team from 2011 to 2013.

Personal
Michael's daughter Kaitlin Nobbs plays hockey and is a member of the New South Wales Arrows and Australian Women's team Development Squad. She made her international debut in 2016 at the International Hockey Open in Darwin, NT. His wife Lee Capes, sister-in-law Michelle Capes and brother-in-law Mark Hager also represented the nation at the Olympic Games.

Hockey Player
In 1984, he was a member of the Australian hockey team at the 1984 Summer Olympics.

Hockey Coach
Following his playing career he coached the India men's national field hockey team from June 2011 until July 2013 including at the 2012 Summer Olympics in London. He also coaches at the Westfields Sports High School, Fairfield in Sydney.

References

External links
 

1954 births
Living people
Australian field hockey coaches
Olympic field hockey players of Australia
Australian male field hockey players
Field hockey players at the 1984 Summer Olympics
Coaches at the 2012 Summer Olympics
Australian expatriate sportspeople in India
Sportsmen from South Australia